Lepidomys cecropia is a species of snout moth in the genus Lepidomys. It was described by Herbert Druce in 1895, and is known from Mexico (including the type location Atoyac, Veracruz) and Guatemala.

References

Moths described in 1895
Chrysauginae